Bruce Grounds or Bruce Park was a baseball ground located in Broad Ripple, Indianapolis, Indiana. The ground was home to the Indianapolis Hoosiers of the American Association in 1884. It was also used for Sunday games by the Indianapolis Hoosiers of the National League in 1887.

The ball field was located at Bruce (now 23rd) Street and College Avenue. The National League club's primary home was Tinker Park. They staged Sunday games at the old AA park, which was outside the city limits at that time, due to blue laws. The club did not draw well at the site because it was too far from the city center. Sunday games during 1888 and 1889 were held at Indianapolis Park.

The ballpark site is now occupied by residential and commercial buildings.

See also
List of baseball parks in Indianapolis

References
Peter Filichia, Professional Baseball Franchises, Facts on File, 1993.

Defunct Major League Baseball venues
Defunct baseball venues in the United States
Sports venues in Indianapolis
Defunct sports venues in Indiana